Jalayer (also Romanized as Jalāyer and Jalāīr; also known as Jalāuer) is a village in Kharrazan Rural District, in the Central District of Tafresh County, Markazi Province, Iran. As of the 2006 census, its population was 150, in 59 families.

References 

Populated places in Tafresh County